is a song by Japanese singer-songwriters Rina Aiuchi and U-ka Saegusa. It was released on 11 April 2007 through Giza Studio, for the soundtrack of the Japanese animated film Detective Conan: Jolly Roger in the Deep Azure. The single became the duo's second single, following "100 mono Tobira" in 2006, which also served as the theme song to the anime series. The single reached number six in Japan and has sold over 36,587 copies nationwide.

Background
In March 2007, Aiuchi and Saegusa announced that they would release the theme song to Detective Conan: Jolly Roger in the Deep Azure, the film adaptation of the Japanese anime series, Case Closed, for which the two had long written the theme songs. It was later confirmed that they recorded the cover versions of the past theme songs to the anime series, "Destiny" by Miki Matsuhashi and "Negai goto Hitotsu dake" by Miho Komatsu.

Commercial performance
"Nanatsu no Umi wo Wataru Kaze no yōni" debuted at number six on the Oricon weekly singles chart and has sold over 36,587 copies in Japan, becoming Aiuchi's best-selling single since "Start" in 2004 and Saegusa's best-selling single overall.

Track listing

Charts

Certification and sales

|-
! scope="row"| Japan (RIAJ)
| 
| 36,587
|-
|}

Release history

References

2007 singles
2007 songs
J-pop songs
Song recordings produced by Daiko Nagato
Songs written by Aika Ohno
Songs written by Rina Aiuchi